Trentola Ducenta is a comune (municipality) in the Province of Caserta in the Italian region Campania, located about  northwest of Naples and about  southwest of Caserta.

Trentola Ducenta borders the following municipalities: Aversa, Casapesenna, Giugliano in Campania, Lusciano, Parete, San Marcellino.

References

Cities and towns in Campania